Neo-Fauvism was a poetic style of painting from the mid-1920s proposed as a challenge to Surrealism. 

The magazine Cahiers d'Art was launched in 1926 and its writers mounted a challenge to the Surrealist practice of automatism by seeing it not in terms of unconscious expression, but as another development of traditional artistry. They identified a group of artists as the exponents of this and termed them Neo-Fauves.

Although these artists were later mostly forgotten, the movement had an effect of disillusioning the Surrealist group with the technique of graphic automatism as a revolutionary means of by-passing conventional aesthetics, ideology and commercialism. 

Neo-Fauvism has been seen as the last trend within painting that could be marketed as a coherent style.

Notes and references

See also
Art history
Visual Arts and Design
History of Painting
Western painting
Fauvism

French art
Western art
Art movements